Disperse Red 60, or 1-amino-4-hydroxy-2-phenoxyanthraquinone, is a popular disperse dye of the anthraquinone family of dyes. It is a dark red solid that is insoluble in water but soluble in dichloromethane.

Because Disperse Red 60 is produced on a large scale, its disposal or degradation has received considerable attention.

References